Not Me is the second full-length album by American singer Glenn Medeiros. It was released in 1988 in the United States and United Kingdom, one year after the release of Medeiros' self-titled debut album, while it would not surface until 1989 in most other countries. Two singles were released in the US to promote the album, each with a promotional music video. The first, "Long and Lasting Love", peaked at No. 68 on the Billboard Hot 100 before the album's release. It also charted in several European countries. The second US single, "Never Get Enough of You", followed in early 1989. This was also released as a 12-inch single, featuring an extended version of the track as well as a radio remix, but it failed to chart. 

In some international countries, the album includes a version of "Nothing's Gonna Change My Love for You"; the original single version of the song, which had become a big hit in various European countries in 1988, was featured on Medeiros' debut album.

Track listing

Note
 Track 12 on some international versions of the album is replaced with "Nothing's Gonna Change My Love for You ('88 Style)".

Personnel
Glenn Medeiros – vocals
Elsa Lunghini – duet vocals
Jeff Porcaro, John Robinson, Cedric Samson – drums
Rhett Lawrence – synthesizer programming, DX7 synth bass, Fairlight CMI programming, drum programming
Tom Keane – Moog synth bass, drum programming
Michael Boddicker – synthesizer programming
Rich Nevens – drums, bass programming
Peter Bunetta – drums, percussion, synthesized bass
Paul Jackson Jr., David Williams – rhythm guitar
Michael Landau, Dann Huff, Michael Thompson, Mitch Coodley – electric guitar
Bill Champlin, Robbie Buchanan, Aaron Zigman, Brad Cole, Rick Chudacoff, Randy Waldman, Paul Mariconda – keyboards
Nathan East, Neil Stubenhaus – bass guitar
Lenny Castro, Rick Gallwey – percussion
Jason Scheff, Tom Keane, Bill Champlin, Bobby Caldwell, Clif Magness, Edie Lehman, Jim Haas, Leslie Smith, Kevin Wells, Tommy Funderburk – backing vocals

Production
Executive producer: Leonard Silver
Production coordination: Angela Bland
Engineering: Miles Christensen, Humberto Gatica, Daren Klein, Rhett Lawrence, Laura Livingston, Frank Wolf
Assistant engineers: Bryan Arnett, Mauricio Guerrero, Rhett Lawrence, Laura Livingston, Marnie Riley, Steve Satkowski
Mixing: Humberto Gatica, Mick Guzauski, Bill Schnee, Russ Terrana, Jeff Tyzik, Gary Wagner
Mix assistants: Mauricio Guerrero, Wade Jaynes, Laura Livingston, Barton Stevens
Mastering: Stephen Marcussen

Charts

Sales and certifications

References

1988 albums
Glenn Medeiros albums
MCA Records albums
Mercury Records albums
Albums produced by Humberto Gatica